Bell Fibe TV is an IP-based television service offered by Bell Canada in the provinces of Ontario and Quebec. It is bundled with a FTTN or FTTH Bell Internet service, and uses the  Mediaroom platform. Bell Fibe TV officially launched on September 13, 2010. It is also available in Manitoba and Atlantic Canada, where Fibe TV is re-packaged, being offered by Bell MTS and Bell Aliant with similar services and integrated with Bell Fibe TV.

History
Bell began researching for a new television solution in 2004 in order to penetrate into urban markets where building owners restricted the installation of satellite dishes.  The launch of Bell ExpressVu for Condos (VDSL service) proved to be ineffective since that service did not allow for customers to benefit from HD programming and PVR options. In 2006, after much research was done, Bell started testing IPTV technologies in Toronto, Quebec City, and Montréal with Bell employees using the ADSL platform. In October 2007, Bell finally launched a pilot project of IPTV branded as Bell Entertainment Service in select areas and buildings of Toronto.  Most of the features that are now available with Fibe TV were offered with Bell Entertainment Service. Some key traits of Bell Entertainment Service were internet and TV charges being billed as one service, "White Glove" customer service and media sharing. After finalizing testing for the new IPTV service in the following years, Bell finally rolled out a contained launch in Toronto and Montreal under the "Bell Fibe TV" brand name in June 2010 followed by an official launch later that year in September.

On July 19, 2016 Bell Canada stated that its FibreOP TV service available in Atlantic Canada would be integrating with Bell Fibe TV in Ontario and Québec.

On September 6, 2016, Bell announced a change to their Fibe TV service. Beginning in 2017, Bell Fibe TV customers would no longer be required to also sign up for Fibe Internet service in order to access their Fibe TV service.

Availability
Bell Fibe TV is currently available in select areas of Ontario and Quebec. It is also available in Atlantic Canada, where Fibe TV is re-packaged, being offered by Bell Aliant with similar services and integrated with Bell Fibe TV.

FibreOP has been rebranded as Fibe. There is constant ongoing expansion in provinces. Those noted being offered by Bell in Ontario and Quebec include: 

1Fibe TV in Almonte and Carleton Place is only available in areas that are served by FTTH.

Hardware 
Bell Fibe TV receivers are manufactured by Arris formerly Motorola. The four models that are currently being offered to subscribers are the HD PVR (VIP2262), 4K PVR (VIP5662), 4K PVR (VIP7802 android tv) wired HD Receiver (VIP2202), and wireless HD Receiver (VIP2502). The HD Receivers can only view programming and do not contain a hard drive; however, they are able to record and access recorded programs through the networked whole home PVR. Previous models included the VIP1232, VIP1216 and VIP1200.

The PVR includes an internal 1TB hard disk drive for recording programs. The PVR and wired HD receivers can be connected to the network through either a coaxial cable or Category 5 cable and the wireless HD receiver connects using 5 GHz 802.11n.

Features
Features of Bell Fibe TV include the following:
 Whole Home PVR: a brand name also used by many of Bell's competitors.  It describes a system where all receivers in a household are connected together via a local network.  This allows viewers to record, pause and playback content from any room in the house.
Fibe TV PVRs can store up to 320 hours of HD content or 150 hours of 4K content with the 4K PVR (5662) or 160 hours of HD content with the 2262. Hours-capacity is doubled for SD (standard definition) 480p channels 1-999.
 Fibe TV On Demand: a VOD service with over 1000 titles, including movies & TV series
 Ability to search for programs by title, cast members, or a simple keyword search. The electronic program guide has 14 days worth of listings and allows viewers to customize the display to show their favourite channels.
 Picture in picture browsing and channel surfing: viewers can watch one channel and browse other channels or channel listings.
 Changing channels happens with virtually no delay compared to satellite service.
 For every standard definition channel subscribed to, customers receive the HD version (when available) at no extra charge in Ontario. Since the programming options are different in Québec, HD channels are included in "The Basic" package but need to be selected separately for any "A La Carte" option.
 TV based apps such as Netflix, Youtube (4K PVR only), Stingray Music, TSN Extra, or The Weather Network.

Channels
Bell Fibe TV provides up to 500 channels (fewer in Atlantic Canada, about half the number available in Ontario) including all major Canadian and US networks, popular specialty services, PPV, sports packages, over 85 international services and over 115 high-definition channels.  Key services include:
 Fibe TV on Demand: Crave, HBO, Treehouse, and YTV. Also providing rental movies from current releases to 2 decades back.
 Crave:  A Canadian subscription video on demand service for cable and satellite subscribers.
 English-language premium movie channels: Crave, Super Channel, and HBO Canada
 Super Écran: A French-language premium movie service.
 Several sport-themed premium services: beIN Sports (HD & En Espanol HD), March Madness HD, MLB Extra Innings (SD & HD), NFL RedZone (SD & HD), NFL Sunday Ticket (SD & HD), NHL Centre Ice (SD & HD) and Sportsnet World (SD & HD)
 Vu!: pay-per-view featuring 50 English-language channels and 22 French-language channels
 Six adult pornography channels (Bell's thirteen Venus pornographic channels are unavailable on Fibe TV)
 Over 150 international channels in over 27 different languages including CPAC, TLN, and Omni 2
 68 radio channels; 47 Stingray Music digital music stations and 19 Canadian commercial radio stations, and Seattle's KUOW-FM

Internet service
Bell Fibe TV used to require a Bell Internet subscription. It is now possible to subscribe to Fibe TV without also subscribing to internet (Bell references it as "Dark TV"), but it is not possible to do so via Bell's website at the moment.  The speed listed for the Internet connection remains unused for the television service.

Simultaneous streaming

with 4K
With the 4K PVR, it is possible to watch or record up to 10 different channels simultaneously, 4 of which can be at 4K resolution.

Up to 6 shows can be recorded simultaneously.

with HD
With the HD PVR, it is possible to watch or record up to 4 different channels simultaneously but only up to three in HD. So to view four different channels, one of them must be in standard definition. The HD PVR can record up to two shows simultaneously.  Note that the same channel playing on two or more receivers only counts as one channel, as receivers that gets tuned to a channel already playing on another receiver will reuse the same video stream.

See also 

 List of United States television stations available in Canada

References

Bell Canada
IPTV companies of Canada
Companies based in Montreal
2010 establishments in Quebec